Loren Edward Ellis (January 7, 1904 – December 19, 1984) was an American football and basketball coach and college athletics administrator.  He served as the head basketball coach at Valparaiso University from 1941 to 1947 and at Stetson University during the 1950–51 season, compiling a career college basketball record of 101–71.  His best squad was his 1944–45 team, they finished with a 21–3 record and a 10-game winning streak.  They were inducted into the Valparaiso Hall of Fame in 2004.  His best player was Robert Dille, a consensus All-American following the 1943–44 season.

Ellis was also the football coach at Valparaiso from 1942 to 1945, though the school did not field a football team in 1943 or 1944.  He tallied a total record of 10–5, his 1945 squad won the Indiana Intercollegiate Conference championship, with an overall record of 6–1.  He remains to this day, the winningest coach (by percentage) in Valparaiso history.

Ellis served as the university's athletic director; he resigned following the 1947 season in order to accept the position of head coach and general manager of the Hammond Buccaneers of the National Basketball League (NBL).  When that franchise folded in 1949, he accepted the position of head coach basketball at Stetson University.

Ellis was graduate of Indiana State Teachers College—now known as Indiana State University.  He was the head basketball coach at Michigan City High School in Michigan City, Indiana from 1930 to 1941; totaling a record of 132-95 (.592), with 3 Sectional titles, 2 Regional titles and 2 berths in the State Semi-Finals.  Ellis died on December 19, 1984, in Eustis, Florida, following an illness lasting six months.

Head coaching record

College football

References

External links
 

1904 births
1984 deaths
Stetson Hatters men's basketball coaches
Valparaiso Beacons athletic directors
Valparaiso Beacons football coaches
Valparaiso Beacons men's basketball coaches
High school basketball coaches in Indiana
Indiana State University alumni